The Jockey Club Sprint is a Group 2 set weights Thoroughbred horse race in Hong Kong, run over 1200 metres. In the 2003/2004 racing season, this race was upgraded to a domestic Group 2 event. The race was promoted to International Group 2 status in 2010. The prize money in season 2011/12 is HK$3,000,000, which was increased to HK$3,875,000 in season 2014/15.

Winners

See also
 List of Hong Kong horse races

References 
Racing Post:
  The Hong Kong Jockey Club - Introduction of The Cathay Pacific Jockey Club Sprint (2011/12)
 Racing Information of The Cathay Pacific Jockey Club Sprint  (2011/12)
 The Hong Kong Jockey Club 

Horse races in Hong Kong